

August Zehender (28 April 1903 – 11 February 1945) was a German SS commander during the Nazi era. He led the SS Division Maria Theresia during World War II and was a recipient of the Knight's Cross of the Iron Cross with Oak Leaves.

Zehender was posted to the SS-Verfügungstruppe in 1935 (his NSDAP party number was 4263133 and his SS service number 224219). He was given command of a motorcycle battalion in the SS Division Das Reich. At the end of June 1941, Zehender was wounded on the Eastern Front at Losza. After his recovery he was posted to the SS Cavalry Brigade. In the spring of 1944, he was given command of the SS Division Maria Theresia, with which he fought at Budapest. 

He was killed in action on 11 February 1945 in Budapest.

Awards

 German Cross in Gold on 16 October 1942 as SS-Sturmbannführer in SS-Kavallerie-Regiment 2
 Knight's Cross of the Iron Cross with Oak Leaves
 Knight's Cross on 10 March 1943 as SS-Obersturmbannführer and commander of the SS-Kavallerie-Regiment 2.
 722nd Oak Leaves on 1 February 1945 as SS-Brigadeführer and commander of the 22. SS-Freiwilligen-Kavallerie-Division "Maria Theresia"

See also
List SS-Brigadeführer

References

Citations

Bibliography

 
 

1903 births
1945 deaths
People from Aalen
SS-Brigadeführer
Recipients of the Gold German Cross
Recipients of the Knight's Cross of the Iron Cross with Oak Leaves
People from the Kingdom of Württemberg
Waffen-SS personnel killed in action
Military personnel from Baden-Württemberg